The Institute of Civil Engineering (I.C.E.) is one of the two education institutes operating under College of Engineering of the University of the Philippines Diliman.

In October 2008, the University of the Philippines Board of Regents approved the transformation of the Department of Civil Engineering to an Institute with the creation of the Institute of Civil Engineering to address the growing need for a center of excellence in civil engineering and its specialized fields, with combined capabilities in instruction, research and extension service. It is the first and only Institute of Civil Engineering in the Philippines.

References

External links
 ERDT Delegates Visit US Research Institutes
 Engineers reiterate lessons from Ondoy
 Civil engineers hold 'green' confab
 

UP Diliman College of Engineering